Lightning Strikes is the sixth studio album by the Japanese heavy metal band Loudness. The album, which was released on July 25, 1986, remained 15 weeks in the U.S. charts, peaking at #64 (Billboard 200). The album was produced by Max Norman. Lyrics for the album are credited to Loudness, even though producer Max Norman did a lot of uncredited work on them.

The album begins with the most commercial sounding song on the album, "Let It Go." However, the rest of the album is in a heavier mold, and is in a relatively similar style to the previous album, Thunder in the East.

The album is known as Shadows of War in Japan, where it was released on March 24, 1986. The tracks are in a different order, and the song "Ashes in the Sky" is known as "Shadows of War." There is also a slight difference in some vocal melodies and arrangements, most notably an extended musical outro to "One Thousand Eyes".

Track listings
All music by Akira Takasaki, except "Face to Face" by Masayoshi Yamashita. Lyrics by Minoru Niihara

Japanese version
Side one
"Shadows of War" - 6:02
"Let It Go" - 4:13
"Streetlife Dreams" - 4:28
"Black Star Oblivion" - 3:55

Side two
"One Thousand Eyes" - 5:02
"Complication" - 4:00
"Dark Desire" - 4:19
"Face to Face" - 3:49
"Who Knows (Time to Take a Stand)" - 4:02

US Version
Side one
"Let It Go" - 4:13
"Dark Desire" - 4:19
"1000 Eyes" - 4:35
"Face to Face" - 3:49
"Who Knows" - 4:02

Side two
"Ashes in the Sky" - 6:02
"Black Star Oblivion" - 3:55
"Street Life Dream" - 4:28
"Complication" - 4:00

Personnel
Loudness
Minoru Niihara - vocals
Akira Takasaki - guitars
Masayoshi Yamashita - bass
Munetaka Higuchi - drums

Additional musicians
Masanori Sasaji - keyboards

Production
Max Norman - producer, mixing at Bearsville Studios, Bearsville, NY, USA
Bill Freesh - engineer
Masachi Goto - assistant engineer
Bob Ludwig - mastering at Masterdisk, New York
Paul Cooper - executive producer
George Azuma - supervisor
Mikio Shimizu, Sam Nagashima - coordinators

References

Loudness (band) albums
1986 albums
Albums produced by Max Norman
Atco Records albums
Warner Music Japan albums